Events in the year 1670 in Norway.

Incumbents
Monarch: Frederick III (until 9 February); then Christian V

Events
 
September – Lisbet Nypan was executed by burning at the stake, while her husband Ole Nypan was beheaded, both in Trondheim.

Arts and literature

Births

12 December – Axel Rosenkrantz, landowner, baron and civil servant (d 1723).

Deaths
September – Lisbet Nypan, alleged witch (born c.1610).

See also

References